This is an alphabetical list of people who have made significant contributions in the fields of system analysis and control theory.

Eminent researchers
The eminent researchers (born after 1920) include the winners of at least one award of the IEEE Control Systems Award, the Giorgio Quazza Medal, the Hendrik W. Bode Lecture Prize, the Richard E. Bellman Control Heritage Award, the Rufus Oldenburger Medal, or higher awards such as the IEEE Medal of Honor and the National Medal of Science. The earlier pioneers such as Nicolas Minorsky (1885–1970), Harry Nyquist (1889–1976), Harold Locke Hazen (1901–1980), Charles Stark Draper (1901–1987), Hendrik Wade Bode (1905–1982), Gordon S. Brown (1907–1996), John F. Coales (1907–1999), Rufus Oldenburger (1908–1969), John R. Ragazzini (1912–1988), Nathaniel B. Nichols (1914–1997), John Zaborszky (1914–2008) and Harold Chestnut (1917–2001) are not included.

Eminent researchers of USSR (including Russian SFSR, Ukrainian SSR, Byelorussian SSR, etc. from 1922 to 1991)

Other active researchers

Historical figures in systems and control

These people have made outstanding historical contributions to systems and control.

See also 
 List of engineers
 List of systems engineers
 List of systems scientists

References

External links 
 People in control, in: IEEE Control Systems Magazine, Volume 24, Issue 5, Oct. 2004 pp 12–15.
 ISA, the International Society for Measurement and Control, homepage.

 
Systems And Control